Robert Roy MacGregor (7 March 1671 – 28 December 1734) was a Scottish outlaw, who later became a folk hero.

Early life
Rob Roy was born in the Kingdom of Scotland at Glengyle, at the head of Loch Katrine, as recorded in the baptismal register of Buchanan, Stirling. His parents were the local Clan MacGregor Tacksman, Donald Glas MacGregor, and Margaret Campbell. He was also descended from the Clan MacDonald of Keppoch through his paternal grandmother.

In January 1693, at Corrie Arklet farm near Inversnaid, he married Mary MacGregor of Comar (1671–1745), who was born at Leny Farm, Strathyre. The couple had four sons: James Mor MacGregor (1695–1754), Ranald (1706–1786), Coll (died 1735) and Robert (1715–1754)—known as Robìn Òig or Young Rob. It has been argued that they also adopted a cousin named Duncan, but this is not certain.

Jacobite risings
Along with many Highland clansmen, at the age of eighteen Rob Roy MacGregor together with his father joined the Jacobite rising of 1689 led by John Graham, 1st Viscount Dundee and Sir Ewen Cameron of Lochiel, to support the Stuart King James VII, whose flight from Britain had been declared by Parliament to be an abdication, following the Glorious Revolution of 1688. Although victorious in initial battles, Dundee was killed at the Battle of Killiecrankie in 1689, deflating the rebellion. MacGregor's father was taken to jail, where he was held on high treason charges for two years. MacGregor's mother Margaret's health failed during Donald's time in prison. By the time Donald was finally released, his wife was dead.

Like many other Scottish clan chiefs during the 17th and 18th centuries, MacGregor operated an extralegal Watch over the cattle herds of the Lowland gentry in return for protection money, which was used to feed the families of his tenants and clansmen. Any cattle that were stolen from herds under his Watch were either retrieved or paid for in full.

MacGregor became a respected cattleman—this was a time when cattle raiding and selling protection against theft were commonplace means of earning a living. MacGregor borrowed a large sum to increase his own cattle herd, but owing to the disappearance of his chief herder, who was entrusted with the money, MacGregor defaulted on his loan.

As a result, he was branded an outlaw, and his wife and family were evicted from their house at Inversnaid, which was then burned down. After his principal creditor, James Graham, 1st Duke of Montrose, seized his lands, MacGregor waged a private blood feud against the Duke, both raiding his cattle and robbing his rents.

Another version of this series of events states that MacGregor's estates of Craigrostan and Ardess were forfeited for his part in the Jacobite rising of 1715. The Duke of Montrose acquired the property in 1720 by open purchase from the Commissioners of Enquiry.

Glen Shira

In 1716, MacGregor moved to Glen Shira for a short time and lived under the protection of John Campbell, 2nd Duke of Argyll, also known as Red John of the Battles, "Iain Ruaidh nan Cath". Argyll negotiated an amnesty and protection for Rob and granted him permission to build a house in the Glen for the surrendering up of weapons. "Traditionally the story goes that Argyll only received a large cache of rusty old weapons." A sporran and dirk handle which belonged to Rob Roy can still be seen at Inveraray Castle. Rob Roy only used this house occasionally for the next three or four years.

In July 1717, MacGregor and the whole of the Clan Gregor were specifically excluded from the benefits of the Indemnity Act 1717 which had the effect of pardoning all others who took part in the Jacobite rising of 1715.

MacGregor participated in the Battle of Glen Shiel in 1719, in which a British Government army with allied Highlanders defeated a force of Jacobite Scots supported by the Spanish. Two of the Jacobite commanders, Lord George Murray and the 5th Earl of Seaforth, were badly wounded. Some accounts claim that Rob Roy himself was wounded, but the actual text of Ormonde's account of the battle provides no evidence for this claim. Instead, it states that Seaforth was wounded: "Finding himself hard-pressed, Lord Seaforth sent for further support. A reinforcement under Rob Roy went to his aid, but before it reached him the greater part of his men had given way, and he himself had been severely wounded in the arm."

Sometime around 1720 and after the heat of MacGregor’s involvement at the Battle of Glen Shiel had died down, Rob Roy moved to Monachyle Tuarach by Loch Doine. Sometime before 1722, he finally moved to Inverlochlarig Beag on the Braes of Balquhidder.

Later life
MacGregor's feud against the Duke of Montrose continued until 1722, when he was forced to surrender. Later imprisoned, he was finally pardoned in 1727. He died in his house at Inverlochlarig Beg, Balquhidder, on 28 December 1734, aged 63.

K. Macleay, M.D., in Historical Memoirs of Rob Roy and the Clan MacGregor quotes, "but he had taken the resolution of becoming a Roman Catholic, and he accordingly left the lonely residence we have described, and returning to Perthshire, went to a Mr. Alexander Drummond, an old priest of that faith, who resided at Drummond Castle." Macleay takes the view that Rob did this out of sorrow for his crimes.

Legacy
Glengyle House, on the shore of Loch Katrine, dates back to the early 18th century, with a porch dated to 1707, and is built on the site of the 17th century stone cottage where Rob Roy is said to have been born. Since the 1930s, the Category B-listed building had been in the hands of successive water authorities, but was identified as surplus to requirements and put up for auction in November 2004, despite objections from the Scottish National Party.

The Rob Roy Way, a long distance footpath from Drymen to Pitlochry, was created in 2002 and named in Rob Roy's honour.

Descendants of Rob Roy settled around McGregor, Iowa, United States, and in 1849 it was reported that the original MacGregor seal and signet was owned by Alex McGregor of Iowa. The Scots Gaelic clan seal was inscribed "S' Rioghal Mo Dhream" ("Royal is my race"). The signet was a bloodstone from Loch Lomond, and was sketched by William Williams.

In 1878, the football club Kirkintilloch Rob Roy was founded and named in his memory.

Early settlers to New Zealand named Roys Peak and Rob Roy Glacier in honour of Rob Roy MacGregor.

In popular culture

The year 1723 saw the publication of a fictionalised account of his life, The Highland Rogue. Rob Roy became a legend in his own lifetime, and George I was moved to issue a pardon for his crimes just as he was about to be transported to the colonies. The publication of Rob Roy, by Sir Walter Scott in 1817, further added to his fame and fleshed out his biography. Hector Berlioz was inspired by the book to compose an overture. William Wordsworth wrote a poem called "Rob Roy's Grave" during a visit to Scotland. (The 1803 tour was documented by his sister Dorothy in Recollections of a Tour Made in Scotland. The editor of the book changed the place of burial to the present location.)

Adaptations of his story have also been told in film, including the silent film Rob Roy (1922); the Walt Disney Productions film Rob Roy, the Highland Rogue (1953); and the Rob Roy (1995) film directed by Michael Caton-Jones, starring Liam Neeson as the title character, and shot entirely on location in the Scottish Highlands.
The 1995 Rob Roy film was also novelized in that year by Donald McFarlan based on the screenplay by Alan Sharp.

In 1894, a bartender at the Waldorf Hotel in New York City created the Rob Roy cocktail in honour of the premiere of Rob Roy, an operetta by composer Reginald De Koven and lyricist Harry B. Smith loosely based upon Robert Roy MacGregor.

In 2017, a new statue of Rob Roy was commissioned to be installed in Peterculter, Aberdeen.  The sculptor appointed was David J. Mitchell, a graduate of Grays School of Art in Aberdeen. The statue was publicly unveiled at a ceremony on the bridge on 16 September 2017.

See also
 Auchenbathie Tower
 Clan Gregor
 Gilderoy (outlaw)
 Rob Roy (dog), US First Lady Grace Coolidge's pet collie featured in a life-size portrait in the White House

References

Bibliography

External links
 
 
 McGregor village museum with a King James Bible bearing Rob Roy's signature
 Rob Roy on the Web
 FAQs about Rob Roy
 "Robert 'Rob Roy' MacGregor: outlaw and folk hero", by Brendan O'Brien, from Scotsman.com, 27 Jan 2005.
 

1671 births
1734 deaths
Burials in Scotland
Scottish outlaws
People from Argyll and Bute
18th-century Scottish people
Scottish folklore
Scottish Jacobites
People of the Jacobite rising of 1719